Thant Sin Maung (born 15 November 1953) is a Burmese politician and former Minister for Transport and Communications of Myanmar (Burma). On 22 March 2016, he was nominated to be Minister for Transport and Communications in President Htin Kyaw's Cabinet. On 24 March, the Assembly of the Union confirmed his nomination.

He previously served as Pyithu Hluttaw MP for Monywa Township.

Early life and education
Thant Sin Maung was born on 15 November 1953 in Monyway village, Monywa Township, Sagaing Division, Burma (now Myanmar) to Lu Lay and Ohn Kyi. He graduated from Rangoon Arts and Science University with M.Sc. in Mathematics.

Career
Thant Zin Maung started working as a tutor in Pathein College and Rangoon Arts and Science University. He then moved to Myanmar Railways as an assistant manager, and worked in various positions until his retirement as a general manager.

In 2015 Myanmar general election, he was elected as a Pyithu Hluttaw MP for Monywa Township. In the aftermath of the military-led 2021 Myanmar coup d'état, the Myanmar Armed Forces asked Thant Sin Maung to vacate his ministerial residence. He was placed under house arrest.

Personal life
He married Khin Than Aye, a medical doctor, and has three children, Arkar Thant Sin, Phoo Thant Sin, and Htoo Thant Sin. And he has 3 main grandchildren named Thitsar Thant Zin, Swan Htet Zarni and Thant Lin Htet.

References

Transport ministers of Myanmar
Communication ministers of Myanmar
1953 births
Living people
People from Sagaing Region
National League for Democracy politicians
University of Yangon alumni
Members of Pyithu Hluttaw